Louis Le Vau (1612 – 11 October 1670) was a French Baroque architect, who worked for Louis XIV of France. He was an architect that helped develop the French Classical style in the 17th century.

Early life and career
Born Louis Le Veau, he was the son of Louis Le Veau (died February 1661), a stonemason, who was active in Paris. His younger brother François Le Vau (born in 1624) also became an architect. The father and his two sons worked together in the 1630s and 1640s. The two brothers later changed the spelling of their surname from "Le Veau" to "Le Vau" to avoid its association with the French word veau (calf).

Le Vau started his career by designing the Hotel de Bautru in 1634. By 1639, he was developing town houses (hôtels particuliers) for rich citizens such as Sainctot, Hesselin, Gillier, Gruyn des Bordes, and Jean Baptiste Lambert in the île Saint-Louis, which was being developed as a residential area. His most notable work during this period is the Hôtel Lambert.

Le Vau also designed country houses, including the Château de Livry, later known as the Château du Raincy.

Royal architect
In 1654, his career was advanced through his appointment as the first architect to the king, succeeding Jacques Lemercier. He was commissioned by Jules Cardinal Mazarin to help rebuild part of the medieval Château de Vincennes.

Shortly after, in 1656 he was given the important commission to build the chateau of Nicolas Fouquet, Vaux-le-Vicomte with the help of André Le Nôtre and Charles Le Brun. Le Vau's most notable work in the Vaux-le-Vicomte is the oval salon facing the garden. This design, an example of a salon à l'italienne (vaulted, two-storied room), develops the idea that a simple form governs the shape of the main section of the building.

In the 1660s Le Vau helped on royal projects, such as the hospital of La Salpêtrière and the facade of the Tuileries Palace. From 1661 to 1664 Le Vau worked on rebuilding the Galerie d'Apollon in the Louvre after it burned in a fire. Claude Perrault and Charles Le Brun were also involved in creating the famous façade for the east front of the Louvre from 1665 to 1674, which acted as a prelude for Classical Architecture in the 18th century.

The most notable work of Le Vau's career was at the Palace of Versailles with which he was involved for the remainder of his life. He added service wings to the forecourts and, after 1668, had rebuilt the garden façade to be totally classical. Le Vau was assisted by François d'Orbay, who completed the work after Le Vau's death. Le Vau and d'Orbay's work at Versailles was later modified and extended by Jules Hardouin-Mansart.

Le Vau's designs for the Collège des Quatre-Nations (now housing the Institut de France) were completed after his death by his assistant François d' Orbay and showed unlikely rapport with Italian baroque techniques.

Louis Le Vau died in Paris.

Notes

Bibliography
 Bajou, Thierry (1998). La peinture à Versailles : XVIIe siècle. [English edition: Paintings at Versailles: XVIIth Century, translated by Elizabeth Wiles-Portier, p. 76.] Paris: Réunion des musées nationaux.  .  (English edition).
 Ballon, Hilary (1999). Louis Le Vau: Mazarin's Collège, Colbert's Revenge. Princeton University Press. .
 Berger, Robert W. (1982). "Le Vau, Louis", in Macmillan Encyclopedia of Architects, edited by Adolf K. Placzek. London: Collier Macmillan. .
 Cojannot, Alexandre (2012). Louis Le Vau et les nouvelles ambitions de l'architecture française 1612–1654. Paris: Picard. .
 Curl, James Stevens (2006). A Dictionary of Architecture and Landscape Architecture, second edition. Oxford: Oxford University Press. .
 Encyclopædia Britannica. "France".
 Encyclopedia of World Biography (2004, 2nd ed.). Gale Ebooks. .
 Feldmann, Dietrich (1996). "Le Vau (1) Louis Le Vau", in The Dictionary of Art (34 vols.), edited by Jane Turner. New York: Grove. . Also at Oxford Art Online, subscription required. 
 Hardouin, Christophe (1994). "La Collection de portraits de l'Académie royale de Peinture et de Sculpture: Peintures entrées sous le règne de Louis XIV (1648–1715", Mémoire de D.E.A., Université de Paris IV, 1994, pp. 164–166.
 Laprade, Albert (1955). "Portraits des premiers architectes de Versailles", Revue des Arts, March 1955, pp. 21–24. 
 Laprade, Albert (1960). François d'Orbay: Architecte de Louis XIV. Paris: Éditions Vincent, Fréal. .

External links

 

French Baroque architects
1612 births
1670 deaths
Architects from Paris
Members of the Académie royale d'architecture
Louis XIV
17th-century French architects
Architects from Versailles